Nuclear transport factor 2 is a protein that in humans is encoded by the NUTF2 gene.

Function 

The protein encoded by this gene is a cytosolic factor that facilitates protein transport into the nucleus. It interacts with the nuclear pore complex glycoprotein p62. This encoded protein acts at a relative late stage of nuclear protein import, subsequent to the initial docking of nuclear import ligand at the nuclear envelope. It is thought to be part of a multicomponent system of cytosolic factors that assemble at the pore complex during nuclear import.

Interactions 

NUTF2 has been shown to interact with Nucleoporin 62{ and RAN.

References

Further reading

External links